Harry Sharpe may refer to:
 Harry Sharpe (footballer)
 Harry Sharpe (cricketer)

See also
 Harry Sharp (disambiguation)